A school of thought is the perspective of a group of people who share common characteristics of opinion or outlook.

School of thought may also refer to:
 Schools of economic thought, a group of thinkers
 Hundred Schools of Thought
 Anarchist schools of thought
 Marxist schools of thought
 Perspectives on capitalism by school of thought 
 School of Thought (album), a 2021 album by American rock band Ded